Agnes Henriëtte Mulder (born 21 October 1973) is a Dutch politician serving as a member of the House of Representatives since 2012. A member of the Christian Democratic Appeal (CDA), she was previously elected to the municipal council of Assen in 2010, where she chaired the party group. Mulder started her political career as a member of the States Provincial of Drenthe, a position she held from 2003 to 2010. She is a member of the Protestant Church in the Netherlands (PKN).

External links 
  CDA website
  Parliament.com biography

1973 births
Living people
21st-century Dutch women politicians
21st-century Dutch politicians
Christian Democratic Appeal politicians
Members of the House of Representatives (Netherlands)
Members of the Provincial Council of Drenthe
Municipal councillors in Drenthe
People from Assen
People from Hardenberg
Protestant Church Christians from the Netherlands
University of Groningen alumni
20th-century Dutch women